Sveto Mitrani is a village in the municipality of Kruševo, North Macedonia.

Demographics
According to the 2021 census, the village had a total of 357 inhabitants. Ethnic groups in the village include:

Macedonians 336
Others 21

References

Villages in Kruševo Municipality